Al-Manar is a sub-district located in Ba'dan District, Ibb Governorate, Yemen. Al-Manar had a population of 11369 as of 2004.

References 

Sub-districts in Ba'dan District